Slow Dance (Hey Mr. DJ) is a number-one R&B single by R. Kelly with Public Announcement, from the album Born into the 90's. The song spent one week at number-one on the US R&B chart and became a minor pop hit on the US Billboard Hot 100, peaking at number forty-three.  This was the second #1 R&B hit for Kelly; the previous being "Honey Love" from the same album.

Charts

Weekly charts

Year-end charts

See also
List of number-one R&B singles of 1992 (U.S.)

References
 
 

1992 singles
R. Kelly songs
Songs written by R. Kelly
1992 songs
Jive Records singles